Chukot Akum or Chukat Ha'Akum is a prohibition in Judaism of imitating Gentile manners in their dressings and practices. The prohibition comes from the Torah commandment "You shall not follow gentile customs" (Leviticus 20:23). Modern life has created many dilemmas on what constitutes a violation of this prohibition and there is ongoing debate about this topic. For example can a Jew attend Thanksgiving dinner or Mother's Day observance without violating this prohibition.

Origin 
The Torah prohibits Jews from imitating the customs of the Gentiles (Leviticus 20:23) . However it does not clearly specify what customs would be called gentile customs.

The Talmud deals with this topic in Avodah Zora 11a when it describes the gentile custom of burning the bed of a kings after he has died. In Sanhedrin 52b similar debate is raised about Gentile custom of beheading criminals with a sword. Both of these mentions believe that burning a king's bed or beheading a criminal do not violate the Torah commandment since these acts are not specifically gentile laws and customs.

Rambam wrote about this topic :

Maharik believed that the gentile customs that are prohibited are those who have no inherent justification because they are suspected of being related to gentile religions. The second category of prohibited customs are those that depart a Jew from humble ways that a Jew should conduct himself. Thus Maharik believed that the Talmudic discussion about burning a King's bed has a logical explanation and is therefore excluded from biblical prohibition.

Sefer ha-Chinuch writes about this topic:

In modern life 
The majority of the opinion believes that the biblical prohibition is about all non-Jews. However Halacha does not consider Islam as idolatry and therefore Muslims are not subjected to the prohibition. Regardless of whether Christianity is idolatrous or not, almost all rabbis believe that following Christian customs falls within the biblical prohibitions.

The commandment for not shaving the beard originated in the Torah command for Jews to be separated from Gentile priests who shaved in according to their religious laws. However some modern Halachic authorities believe that growing a beard or following modern fashion trends do not necessarily separate the Jew from the gentile in modern societies.

References 

Book of Leviticus
Negative Mitzvoth